Double Coffee is a coffee house company based in Latvia. As of early 2014, the company had a total of 15 locations in Riga, Latvia in addition to seven locations in Russia, and one in each Kyiv, Ukraine, Cairo, Egypt and Baku, Azerbaijan. Double Coffee was founded in 2002, and during its history has also had branches in Estonia, Lithuania, Belarus and China.

History
The first Double Coffee cafe opened on 26 September 2002, in the city of Riga, on Stabu Street. The year it was founded it won the best trader in Riga 2002, and also the best Latvian trader 2002.
Five new Double Coffee houses opened in 2003 and at the end of 2005 there were 16 in Latvia with branches subsequently opening in Estonia, Lithuania, Belarus and Ukraine. The chain opened its first non-European branch in June 2009 in Beijing, China  In 2009, the Estonian section of the chain went bankrupt, followed in 2011 by bankruptcy in Lithuania and a withdrawal from both those countries' markets.

See also
 List of coffeehouse chains

References

External links
Double Coffee Latvia - Official Facebook fan page

Coffeehouses and cafés
Companies based in Riga
Restaurants established in 2002
2002 establishments in Latvia
Latvian brands